The AA Blue Ridge District is a district in the Region III of the Virginia High School League. The district is centered around the Roanoke Valley in Southwest Virginia and is named for the Blue Ridge Mountains, which feature prominently in the region's geography.

History
From the late 1980s through the early 2000s, the district steadily grew as four schools dropped in classification from the former AAA Roanoke Valley District. Two schools entered after the AA New River Valley District disbanded when other schools dropped in classification to Group A. For the 2002–2003 school year, the student body of Group AAA Cave Spring High School in Roanoke County was split into two Group AA sized schools with the opening of Hidden Valley High School. These two new schools gave the district eleven members that year except in football, where Cave Spring remained in AAA and Hidden Valley did not play a full schedule.

The district was split for the 2003–2004 school year. The name Blue Ridge District remained with this group of schools because Alleghany, Lord Botetourt, and William Byrd had the longest tenures in the district. The other group of six schools formed the AA River Ridge District. The Blue Ridge District only had four members starting in the 2007–2008 school year when William Fleming returned to Group AAA, but it grew to five members starting in the 2009–2010 school year when former member Staunton River returned from the AA Seminole District and to six members in the 2010–2011 school year when former member Rockbridge County returned from the AA Southern Valley District.

The Blue Ridge District will be preserved in the 2013-2014 VSHL reclassification.  William Fleming will also return to the district from the AAA Western Valley District.  The district will include schools from classifications 3A and 4A. Each school will compete only against members of the same classification in post-season play.

Geographic Makeup
The district is composed of large and medium-sized high schools primarily in the eastern and northern areas of the Roanoke Valley.  The district currently includes two schools located in Roanoke County, and one each in Bedford County, Botetourt County, Franklin County, and Roanoke City.

Regional and State Competition
While the VHSL uses District formatting for regular season contests and determining postseason eligibility, the teams are divided into different classes and regions for Regional and State-level competitions.  As such, Blue Ridge District members compete in the following formats (as of 2022):
Class 6, Region A (Franklin County)
Class 5, Region D (William Fleming)
Class 3, Region D (Lord Botetourt, Northside, Staunton River, William Byrd)

Current member schools
Franklin County High School Eagles of Rocky Mount, VA
Lord Botetourt High School Cavaliers of Daleville, VA
Northside High School Vikings of Roanoke, VA
Staunton River High School Golden Eagles of Moneta, VA
William Byrd High School Terriers of Vinton, VA
William Fleming High School Colonels of Roanoke, VA

Former member schools with current affiliations
 Alleghany High School, Covington, Virginia Three Rivers District
 Blacksburg High School, Blacksburg, Virginia River Ridge District
 Cave Spring High School, Roanoke, Virginia River Ridge District
 Christiansburg High School, Christiansburg, Virginia River Ridge District
 Covington High School, Covington, Virginia Pioneer District
 Glenvar High School, Salem, Virginia Three Rivers District
 Hidden Valley High School, Roanoke, Virginia River Ridge District
 James River High School, Buchanan, Virginia Three Rivers District
 Liberty High School, Bedford, Virginia Seminole District
 Pulaski County High School, Dublin, Virginia River Ridge District
 Rockbridge County High School, Lexington, Virginia Valley District
 Salem High School, Salem, Virginia River Ridge District

References 

Virginia High School League